Hacı Qaraqaşlı (also, Hacıqaraqaşlı, Adakar, Adzhikarakashly, Gadzhikarakashly, and Gadzhykarakashly) is a village and municipality in the Davachi Rayon of Azerbaijan.  It has a population of 315.

References 

Populated places in Shabran District